The Los Angeles Lakers are an American professional basketball team based in Los Angeles that competes in the National Basketball Association (NBA), which was formerly called the Basketball Association of America (BAA). Since 1999, the Lakers have played their home games at Crypto.com Arena. The Lakers' franchise was founded in 1947 in Minneapolis. The first owners purchased the disbanded Gems from Detroit, Michigan, then renamed and moved the team. It was in Minneapolis where the Lakers received their official title from Minnesota's nickname, Land of 10,000 Lakes. The Lakers won five championships before relocating to Los Angeles for the 1960–61 NBA season. The Lakers went on to lose all of their six appearances in the NBA Finals in the 1960s, despite the presence of Elgin Baylor and Jerry West. In , the Lakers compiled a 33-game winning streak, the longest streak in U.S. professional team sports, and won their sixth title, under coach Bill Sharman. The Lakers' popularity soared in the 1980s when they won five additional championships during a nine-year span with the help of Hall of Famers Magic Johnson, Kareem Abdul-Jabbar, James Worthy and coach Pat Riley, the franchise's all-time leader in both regular season and playoff games coached and wins. Two of those championships during that span were against their arch-rivals, the Boston Celtics. With the help of Shaquille O'Neal, Kobe Bryant, and Hall of Fame coach Phil Jackson, the Lakers played in seven NBA Finals between 2000 and 2010, winning three of them consecutively from 2000 to 2002, losing the next two in 2004 and 2008, and winning in 2009 and 2010; the last three appearances were without O'Neal.

The Lakers hold records for having (at the end of the 2014–15 NBA season) the most wins (3,125), the highest winning percentage (.620), the most NBA Finals appearances (32) of any NBA franchise, second-fewest non-playoff seasons with seven and are tied with the Boston Celtics with the most NBA championships with 17. They have won 60+ regular season games 11 times, trailing only the Boston Celtics in this category.

The team struggled during the mid to late 2010s, during which they suffered the longest playoff drought in franchise history, failing to qualify for the postseason for six seasons. Before that stretch, they had missed the playoffs only five times in their entire existence up to 2013.

The Lakers' fortunes turned around following the signing of LeBron James in the summer of 2018 and a trade for Anthony Davis in 2019. The team finished the 2020 regular season as the first seed in the Western Conference for the first time since 2010 and won the 2020 NBA Finals, their first championship since 2010.

Table key

Seasons

All-time records
Note: Statistics are correct as of the 2022 NBA playoffs.

NBA records

Sources:

NBL records

Sources:

Notes

References
General

Specific

 
seasons
Events in Los Angeles